Homophylotis pseudothyridota is a species of moth in the family Zygaenidae. It is found in Australia from north-eastern Queensland.

The length of the forewings is 5–5.5 mm for males and 5 mm for females. The upperside of the forewings is dark greyish brown, sometimes with a faint greenish tinge. The underside is paler. The hindwing upper- and underside is dark greyish brown, with a translucent central area of variable size and shape crossed by densely scaled fuscous veins.

References

Moths described in 2005
Procridinae